El Mariel is the second studio album by Cuban-American rapper Pitbull. It was released on October 31, 2006 through TVT Records and Bad Boy Latino. The album was leaked onto the internet on October 27, 2006, four days before the album was released. The album features production from Lil Jon, Diaz Brothers, DJ Khaled, Mr. Collipark, The Neptunes and Jim Jonsin. It also includes guest appearances from Fat Joe, Wyclef Jean, Lil Jon, Twista and Trick Daddy among others. A Spanish-language version of the album was also released on October 31, 2006 featuring the three singles from the album, along with twelve Spanish-only tracks.

El Mariel was supported by four singles: "Bojangles", "Ay Chico (Lengua Afuera)", "Dime" and "Be Quiet". The album received generally mixed reviews from music critics and was a moderate commercial success. It debuted at number 17 on the US Billboard 200 chart, selling 48,000 copies in its first week.

Critical reception

AllMusic's David Jeffries noted that the album's political aspects are misleading, but praised it for having catchy party music mixed with the serious tracks and Pitbull for showing a little depth in his lyrical repertoire, concluding that, "While it's hard to deny the more mature Pitbull is something that needs to be explored further, it's just as hard to deny the rump-shaking, trunk-rumbling stunners he drops all over the album." Steve 'Flash' Juon of RapReviews praised the album's reggaeton sound and Pitbull's improvement as a lyricist and musician, concluding that, "Hip-Hop in South Florida is now more universal than ever thanks in large part to Pitbull's infectious flow and machismo." Agustin Gurza of the Los Angeles Times praised the record for conveying an artist that carries multiple dimensions and facets of a lived life, saying "we meet a Pitbull who is even likable and vulnerable."

Jesús Triviño Alarcon of XXL, while praising the tracks that involved serious topics, felt the record was overhauled by a majority of the nondescript dance club tracks, concluding that "[T]he music may knock in the club, but Pitbull’s lack of diversity is a major issue." Evan Serpick of Rolling Stone was critical of Pitbull's flow throughout the album, saying that it works in the party tracks but the slower ones bring out lyricism that's limp, concluding that "his hot flow and ice-cold lyrics are better served in the club." Andres Tardio of HipHopDX said he saw potential based on the record's title and its serious tracks but felt it was wasted opportunity because of Pitbull not being able to stay on topic.

Commercial performance
El Mariel debuted at number 17 on the US Billboard 200 chart, selling 48,000 copies in its first week. The album also debuted at number one on the US Top Independent Albums chart, becoming Pitbull's second number one on the chart. As of April 2007, the album has sold over a total of 214,000 copies in the United States.

Track listing

Sample credits
"Come See Me" contains a sample of "La Murga" by Willie Colón featuring Hector Lavoe
"Fuego" contains a sample of "When I Hear Music" by Debbie Deb
"Hey You Girl" contains a sample of "Rock Lobster" by The B-52's

Best Buy Bonus DVD
 The Making of El Mariel-Directed By Bobby Viera
 Bojangles (Remix) Video
 Bojangles Live Performance Video-Directed By Bobby Viera
 La Esquina: Trading Races

Charts

Weekly charts

Year-end charts

References

2006 albums
Pitbull (rapper) albums
Albums produced by the Runners
Albums produced by Lil Jon
Albums produced by Pharrell Williams
Albums produced by Jim Jonsin
Albums produced by Mr. Collipark
Albums produced by DJ Toomp